Verona Sands is a rural locality in the local government area (LGA) of Huon Valley in the South-east LGA region of Tasmania. The 2016 census recorded a population of 78 for the state suburb of Verona Sands.

History 
Verona Sands was gazetted as a locality in 1968.

Geography
The waters of the Huon River estuary form the southern boundary.

Road infrastructure 
Route B68 (Channel Highway) runs through from south-west to south-east.

References

Towns in Tasmania
Localities of Huon Valley Council